Kęsgailos (plural; singular: Kęsgaila) was a Lithuanian noble family, one of the largest landowners in the Grand Duchy of Lithuania. Their seat was in the Samogitia and Trakai regions. Kęsgailos family members had been the Elders of Samogitia from 1412 until 1532.

According to the 1528 census of the Grand Duchy of Lithuania, the family had to provide the most troops in the Grand Duchy of Lithuania. The family died out in the 16th century, the last member of the family was Stanislovas, who was a close friend of Grand Duke Sigismund II Augustus and supported his marriage with Barbara Radziwiłł.

Name
The surname Kęsgaila comes from the native first name of Mykolas Kęsgaila (son of Valimantas, son of Bushka) whose elder brother Jaunutis son of Valimantas was granted the Zadora coat of arms in the Union of Horodło of 1413. In line with the common practice for nobles' names after the Christianization of Lithuania, after his baptism, the Christian name *Mīkālas (Michael) was added to a pagan Lithuanian name, which can be reconstructed as *Kensgaĭla (from kęsti ("be patient") and gailas ("strong")). His son Jonas Kęsgailaitis, mentioned in written sources in Latin as Johannes Kyensgalowicz, was a bearer of the name as a patronymic, which subsequently evolved into a family name. Its Polonized form Kieżgajło is most common in Polish historiography over other variants, such as Kezigal, Kieżgajłła, Gezgajło, Kiezgajło, Kieżgajłło, Kierżgajłło, Kieżgałło and Kieżgało. Kęsgaila (plural Kęsgailos) is a modern Lithuanian spelling of the original family name.

Family tree
Family is presented based on Rimvydas Petrauskas.

References